Alba (also called Alba del Campo) is a municipality located in the province of Teruel, Aragon, Spain. According to the 2018 census the municipality had a population of 178 inhabitants. Its postal code is 44395.

It is located at high altitude near the Cerro de San Cristóbal, among the Sistema Ibérico mountains.

See also
Comunidad de Teruel
List of municipalities in Teruel

References

External links 
 Official Website (in Spanish)

Municipalities in the Province of Teruel